iOS 16 is the sixteenth and current major release of the iOS mobile operating system developed by Apple for its iPhone line of products. It was announced at the company's Worldwide Developers Conference (WWDC) on June 6, 2022, as the successor to iOS 15.

The first developer beta was released on June 6, 2022 immediately after WWDC, with the first public beta being released on July 11, 2022. The public version of iOS 16 was released on September 12, 2022.

iOS 16 is very similar to iPadOS 16. It is the first iOS version to work only on iPhones, as it dropped support for the seventh-generation and final iPod Touch.

System features

Freeform
Freeform is a whiteboard app that lets users collaborate together in real time.

AirDrop 
In 16.2, the default setting is "Contacts Only", and the "Everyone" setting was changed to "Everyone for 10 Minutes", which reverts to "Contacts Only" after 10 minutes "to prevent unwanted requests to receive content".  This change was made in 16.1.1 for iPhones in China.

Lock screen
The lock screen's appearance is now customizable and it can host Widgets. The font and text color for the date and time can be customized and color effects can be applied to the entire lock screen. The date is now above the time and a small widget can be added next to the date. Other widgets can be added and arranged horizontally on the third row, below the time.
Multiple lock screens can be set up.
The live wallpapers have been removed because of the new tap and hold gesture that would allow users to customize their lockscreen.
The lock screen now also supports landscape mode, arranging elements horizontally instead of vertically when the phone orientation is horizontal.
When listening to music, tapping the album cover will cause the cover to appear full-sized in the center of the Lock screen, with a color-matched background.

Title change
For the first time in Chinese interface, iOS 16 rewrites the title of the user from "您" and "您的" to the current "你" and "你的", and some third-party applications still keep the title "您" and "您的".  When using the system for the first time, in the agreement dialogue on the same screen, two different appellations of "您" and "你" can be seen to address the user at the same time.  There is no information to explain the reason for the change of title.

Improved focus mode
Different lock screens can be set up based on the active focus.
Focus filters allow apps to show different content based on active focus. For example, Safari can only show opened tabs work-related if the user is in the Work focus, the Mail app can only show email messages that don't come from work contacts if they are not in the allowed list for Work, etc.
It is now possible to create lists of apps and contacts to be silenced and those to be allowed.

Notifications
Notifications now appear from below the lock screen, rather than above.
It is possible to show notifications in three different styles: count, stack or list. Notifications can be grouped together with two fingers to reduce them to a counter.
There are new notification widgets for the lock screen that show data in real time, allowing the user to follow events continuously without being flooded by separate notifications. They take advantage of the new Real-time Notifications introduced with iOS 16.

Control Center
A new drop-down menu in Control Center shows all apps that have recently accessed the camera, microphone or location, new control center toggle for quick notes. 
The sound recognition Shazam feature now integrates its history with the main Shazam application's history, instead of the histories being separated.

Status bar
The status bar can now display the battery percentage on iPhones with Face ID, so the user doesn't need to pull-down the Control Center to see it.

Settings in landscape
The Settings app now also supports landscape mode, showing on the left the setting list and on the right the current opened settings page.

Improved dictation
During text dictation, the keyboard is always present and allows the user to switch from speech to manual typing and vice versa without interruptions. It is also possible to insert emojis through dictation. Auto-Punctuation automatically inserts a period when there is a pause in the dictation.

Improved Live Text
Ability to select and manipulate text in videos.
Quick actions are commands available directly on the Live Text. It is possible to make price conversions to another currency or translate text on the fly.
Support expanded to Japanese, Korean, and Ukrainian.

Improved Visual Search
Visual Search is now able to extract objects and people recognized in photos; they can be interacted with to do things such as drag and drop them into other apps.

Siri improvements
It is possible to end cellular and FaceTime calls by simply saying "Hey Siri, Hang up".
 Siri can now announce notifications on speaker.

Spotlight
A new button to access Spotlight directly from the Home Screen.
The search input text box is now anchored to the keyboard, instead of being at the top, in order to be more accessible using the phone with one hand.
More image results from apps like Messages, Notes, and Files.
Quick actions like starting a timer or running a shortcut.

Translate
Now allows the user to activate the Camera to translate text that is recognized live.
Adds support for Dutch, Indonesian, Polish, Thai, Turkish, and Vietnamese.

Spoken Content
New voice options have been added for some supported languages (including “Novelty” voices for English), and voices and support have been added for the following languages:
Bangla
Basque
Bhojpuri
Bulgarian
Catalan
Croatian
Galician
Kannada
Malay
Marathi
Persian
Shanghainese
Slovenian
Tamil
Telugu
Ukrainian
Vietnamese
"Premium" options have been added for a few specific voices.
Users can now play samples of voices before downloading them.

Improved accessibility
Door detection is a feature that allows visually impaired people to be guided by the camera. It is able to recognize the presence of a door and signals how many meters away it is.
A new accessibility setting allows the user to prevent phone calls from being ended by locking the phone.

Wi-Fi network improvements
Previously saved Wi-Fi networks are now shown which can be edited, deleted or selected to view the network password after authentication via Face ID or Touch ID. Prior to this change, users’ only option for removing previously connected-to networks was to tap ‘forget this network’ from within the settings app which could only be done if currently connected to that network. Users also had (and still have) the ability to wipe all previously known networks from their iOS devices by choosing ‘erase network settings’ from Settings–>General–>Transfer or reset iPhone(at bottom)–>Reset–>Reset Network Settings. The latter option is frequently advised to those seeking to fix a multitude of both Wi-Fi and cellular network issues arising on users iOS devices.

Cellular network improvements
During the configuration of the Cellular Network, the eSIM from another iPhone can be transferred via Bluetooth.

Backup 
Backups to iCloud can now also be made on 4G, alongside 5G and Wi-Fi.

Face ID
Face ID now works when the phone is oriented horizontally. It is limited to the iPhone 13 models and the iPhone 14 models.

Keyboard
Haptic feedback can be enabled for the keyboard; while typing text a small vibration can be felt which simulates the pressing of mechanical keys.

Controller support
iOS 16, iPadOS 16, and tvOS 16 now support connecting Nintendo Switch Joy-Con and Pro Controllers.

Augmented reality
A new framework dubbed RoomPlan will allow apps to quickly create 3D floor plans of rooms using the LiDAR Scanner introduced with the iPhone 12 Pro and iPhone 12 Pro Max.

App features

Messages
Sent messages can be edited within 15 minutes and can be deleted within 2 minutes.
Ability to mark an entire discussion as unread.
SharePlay is now available in the Messages app to watch a movie or listen to music with friends, without requiring them to make a FaceTime call.
Recover deleted messages for up to 30 days.
Collaboration: ability to invite someone to work on a project, so that every time someone edits a shared document, the user receives updates in a thread of the Messages app. It works with iOS apps such as Files, Keynote, Numbers, Pages, Notes, Reminders, Safari, and third-party apps designed to take advantage of this Collaboration feature.
On audio messages previously sent or received, users can swipe with the finger on the sound wave graph to position at the exact point.
Ability to report SMS/MMS junk to Carriers.

FaceTime
Live Captions automatically transcribes what is said during a FaceTime call.

Mail
Mail messages can be scheduled to be sent later.
Recently 'sent' emails can be canceled within ten seconds.
Ability to put on top and set a reminder for messages the user hasn't responded to yet.
Improved search corrects typos based on the content of their messages.
New rich links give email messages more context and details at a glance.

Maps
 Multi-stop routing is now available. Multiple intermediate stops can be added to routes, for a maximum of up to 15 stops. Users can also ask Siri to add a new stop point while they are navigating.
Pay in Transit, now can calculate cost of fares.
New MapKit features supporting Look Around and the Detailed City Experience.

Photos
Photos can be shared from the user’s library with five different contacts. Shared photos can be edited or deleted freely by these contacts.
The Hidden and Recently Deleted albums are now protected by Face ID or Touch ID, unless the user turns this off in Settings.
It is now possible to copy filters and effects from an image to other images.
It is possible to search for certain text inside of images.
When cropping photos, there is now a Wallpaper format which will crop the photo to the same aspect ratio as the devices display.
Automatic duplicate detection automatically detects and groups duplicate photos or videos together. The higher quality version will be kept and the relevant data of the duplicates will be merged into the kept photo.

Camera
While taking photos there is a button to toggle between whether the photo will be automatically shared to their Shared Photo Library or only be saved to their personal photo library.
The Camera app has the live translate feature built-in the viewfinder.

Safari
Shared tab groups: Groups of tabs can be shared with others to work on them together and see in real time which tab others are looking at.
Pinned tabs: in the opened tabs view, tabs can be pinned to the top.
Tab group start pages: each tab group can have a different start page containing Favorites, Frequently Visited, etc.
Extension syncing: users can extensions are installed on other devices and decide to install them on the current device. After they are installed, they are synced across all devices and are enabled on one device, so that they enable on all of them.
Website Settings syncing: website settings such as Page Zoom, Request Desktop website, Use Reader automatically, etc. can be synced across all devices, so just set them on one device that are automatically set to all others.
Added support for AVIF image format

Notes
A quick note can be created directly from the Lock Screen.
Quick notes can be created in any app using the share menu.

Contacts
Duplicate contacts are now automatically detected and users can merge them individually.
When sharing contacts, individual fields can be selected to only share that information.
It's possible to group contacts into separate lists to better organize them and easily send an email to all the members of that list.
Ability to export contact lists to file

Calendar
It is now possible to copy and paste events between the various days of the calendar.

Files
New Quick Actions on a file allow the user to convert an image to another format JPEG, PNG, HEIF and resize it to Small, Medium, Large, Original.

Tips
The tips UI has been refreshed.

Books
The toolbar containing the reading settings, search and bookmarks has been replaced by a pop-up panel placed in an icon at the bottom in order to increase the space available for the contents and also to be more accessible when using the phone with one hand.
Ability to adjust the line spacing, character spacing, word spacing and activate the full justification for text.
A new theme calibrates the page colors automatically based on the ambient light using True Tone.

Health
Users can add and manage the medications they take.
Sleep stages allows users to monitor the sleep phases detected by the Apple Watch.

Apple News
New "My Sports" section for highlights, videos and news regarding sports teams. Users can add their favorite sports teams for use with My Sports.
Expanded local news.
New Favorites group.

Weather
New forecast modules for details about air quality, local forecasts, etc.
Hourly forecasts for the next 10 days, with minute-by-minute precipitation intensity over the next hour.
More detailed and easier to understand interactive graphs have been added that show exact trends over time of temperature, wind, humidity, etc.
Receive government notifications about severe weather events like tornadoes, winter storms, flash floods, etc.

Fitness
The app is now available even if the user doesn't own an Apple Watch.

Home
Added support for the new international standard Matter for home automation.

Apple TV
iOS 16 allows cross-device connectivity in tvOS 16 for new experiences between Apple TV, Apple Watch, and iPhone.

Security and privacy

Lockdown mode
Lockdown mode is a special mode that, when activated, raises the security to the highest possible level by restricting some features of the OS, apps and web platform, in order to protect users from the rarest and most sophisticated attacks. 

Unlike many other security features, lockdown mode is regarded as an “extreme, optional” mode that is not intended to be activated by the majority of users. Rather, it is designed as a defense against advanced malware and mercenary spyware, such as clickless exploits or zero-click attacks, which are often hyper-targeted toward influential individuals such as journalists, diplomats, politicians, activists, lawyers, and high-profile business people.

It is possible to disable the Lockdown mode on specific websites and apps by acting from the Safari’s Website Settings and the Lockdown mode's Web Browsing setting.

Passkeys
Passkeys allows the user to authenticate to services that implement WebAuthn across their devices without using passwords. Passkeys are generated by the phone and permission is granted via Face ID or Touch ID.

Safety Check
Safety Check resets all access permissions given to people, apps, and devices for an iCloud account when activated; this is designed to help those in abusive relationships.

Rapid Security Response
Important security updates are now distributed without requiring an entire OS update. Users can optionally remove the security updates, although the standard update will still include the security fixes.

Clipboard security improved
Applications and websites now require permission to copy from the clipboard.

Private Access Tokens
Private Access Tokens are a new technology that replaces CAPTCHAs and helps in identifying HTTP requests from legitimate devices and people without compromising their identity or personal information.

Brand Indicators for Message Identification
Brand Indicators for Message Identification (BIMI) helps users to easily verify authenticated emails sent by brands by displaying the brand's logo alongside the email's header.

Supported devices
iOS 16 marks the first time since iOS 13 that Apple dropped support for any device. The following devices with Apple A9 and A10 Fusion chips had support dropped: the iPhone 6S, iPhone 6S Plus, iPhone 7, iPhone 7 Plus, iPhone SE (1st generation) and iPod touch (7th generation). The cutoff for the iPhone 7 and 7 Plus has been criticized due to the iPad 5th, 6th and 7th generations supporting iPadOS 16 despite having similar or even weaker hardware.

The supported devices, iPhones with A11 Bionic chip or newer, include the following. However, devices with an A11 chip (That is, 8, 8 Plus and X) have limited support.

 iPhone 8 & 8 Plus
 iPhone X
 iPhone XS & XS Max
 iPhone XR
 iPhone 11
 iPhone 11 Pro & 11 Pro Max
 iPhone SE (2nd generation)
 iPhone 12 & 12 Mini
 iPhone 12 Pro & 12 Pro Max
 iPhone 13 & 13 Mini
 iPhone 13 Pro & 13 Pro Max
 iPhone SE (3rd generation)
 iPhone 14 & 14 Plus
 iPhone 14 Pro & 14 Pro Max

Release history 

The first developer beta of iOS 16 was released on June 6, 2022. iOS 16 was officially released on September 12, 2022.

See Apple's official release notes, and official security update contents.

See also
 iOS
 iPadOS 16
 macOS Ventura
 tvOS 16
 watchOS 9

References

External links
  – official site

16
2022 software
Products introduced in 2022
Mobile operating systems
Proprietary operating systems